Valerijonas Šadreika (20 June 1938 – 29 June 1991) was a Lithuanian politician.  In 1990 he was among those who signed the Act of the Re-Establishment of the State of Lithuania.

References

1938 births
1991 deaths
Lithuanian politicians